The World's Oldest Living Bridesmaid is an American romantic comedy film written by Janet Kovalcik and directed by Joseph L. Scanlan. The film stars Donna Mills as Brenda Morgan, a single woman and lawyer who gets romantically involved with her younger secretary (played by Brian Wimmer). The film premiered on September 21, 1990, on CBS.

Cast
 Donna Mills as Brenda Morgan
Brian Wimmer as Alex Dante
Winston Rekert as Brian
Art Hindle as Roger
 Beverly Garland as Brenda's Mother

References

External links

1990 television films
American romantic comedy-drama films
Comedy-drama television films
Romance television films
Films shot in Toronto